Halloween Ends is a 2022 American slasher film directed by David Gordon Green and co-written by Green, Danny McBride, Paul Brad Logan and Chris Bernier. It is the sequel to Halloween Kills (2021), the thirteenth installment in the Halloween franchise, and the final film in the trilogy of sequels that started with the 2018 film, which directly follows the 1978 film. The film stars Jamie Lee Curtis, Andi Matichak, Rohan Campbell, Will Patton, Kyle Richards, and James Jude Courtney. The plot follows Corey Cunningham, a young man who falls in love with Laurie Strode's granddaughter while a series of events, including crossing paths with Michael Myers, render him a murderous outcast.

Before the release of Halloween in 2018, McBride confirmed that he and Green had intended to pitch two films that would be shot back-to-back, but decided against it, waiting to see the reaction to the first film. Following the success of the first film, in July 2019, the film's title was announced along with Halloween Kills. Green intended to give each film in the trilogy its own unique theme, Halloween Ends being a "love story"; John Carpenter described the film as a "departure" from its predecessors. After being delayed due to the ongoing COVID-19 pandemic, principal photography took place in Georgia between January and March 2022, with re-shoots taking place in mid-2022.

Halloween Ends premiered at Beyond Fest in Los Angeles on October 11, 2022, and was theatrically released in the United States on October 14, 2022, by Universal Pictures. The film started streaming simultaneously on paid tiers of Peacock for 60 days. It received mixed reviews from critics, who criticized its focus on the new character Corey and generally deemed it a disappointing conclusion to the trilogy. The film grossed $105 million against a $33 million production budget, making it the lowest-grossing of the trilogy of films by Green.

Plot

On Halloween night in 2019, 21-year-old Corey Cunningham babysits a young boy named Jeremy, who pulls a prank on him by locking him inside the attic. Just as Jeremy's parents come home, Corey kicks the door open and accidentally knocks Jeremy over a staircase railing to his death. Corey is accused of intentionally killing Jeremy but is cleared of manslaughter.

Three years later, the town of Haddonfield, Illinois, is still reeling from the aftermath of Michael Myers's latest killing spree in 2018, while Michael has vanished. Laurie Strode is writing a memoir, having bought a new house and living with her granddaughter Allyson, who is now a nurse. Meanwhile, Corey is working at his stepfather's salvage yard. On his way home one day, he is accosted by high school bullies and injures himself in the process. An observing Laurie brings him to the doctor's office where Allyson works. Allyson and Corey develop a relationship and later attend a Halloween party, where Corey is confronted by Jeremy's mother. After having an argument with Allyson, Corey leaves the party and runs into the bullies, who throw him off a bridge. He is dragged into the sewers and choked by Michael, who eventually lets him go. As he crawls out, Corey is threatened by a homeless man. In a struggle, Corey stabs the man to death and flees.

Corey seeks out Allyson to make amends, and the two go on a dinner date. They are interrupted by Allyson's ex-boyfriend, police officer Doug Mulaney, who harasses them both. Corey later lures Doug into the sewer. Michael emerges and, although in a weakened condition, kills Doug to Corey's delight. Allyson is passed over for a promotion at work, in favor of a nurse who is having an affair with the doctor. Later that night, Corey kills the doctor at his home while Michael kills the nurse. An unknowing Allyson plans to leave Haddonfield with an insistent Corey because of the past trauma, while Laurie becomes increasingly suspicious of Corey. Speaking to Jeremy's father, Laurie realizes Corey is infected by Michael's evil.

On October 31, Laurie finds Corey sleeping in the spot where Jeremy died, and offers to help him on the condition that he distance himself from Allyson. Corey retorts by blaming her for the events that have occurred in Haddonfield and says if he cannot have Allyson, no one will. Corey returns to the sewers and successfully fights a still-weak Michael for his mask. Meanwhile, Laurie and Allyson argue as she plans to leave, and Allyson, too, blames Laurie for Michael's actions. That night, a masked Corey embarks on a rampage, murdering the bullies after luring them to the salvage yard, one of whom accidentally kills Corey's stepfather. He goes on to kill his mother and a DJ at a local radio station, who had taunted him earlier.

At the Strode house, Laurie fakes a suicide attempt to lure Corey to her, whom she shoots down the stairs. Corey then stabs himself in the neck to frame Laurie for his death in front of the arriving Allyson, who leaves in distress. Michael suddenly arrives, retrieves his mask, and kills Corey. A fight ensues in Laurie's kitchen, and Laurie manages to pin Michael to the kitchen table and slit his throat. After a struggle, Allyson, convinced of the truth behind Corey's death after receiving a call from Frank, returns to help subdue and finally kill him by slicing his wrist. Laurie and Allyson take Michael's body to the salvage yard by police escort, attracting the residents of Haddonfield, who follow them in a procession, and dispose of it in an industrial shredder. In the ensuing days, Allyson and Laurie reconcile, and Allyson leaves Haddonfield while Laurie finishes her memoir and rediscovers her romance with Deputy Hawkins.

Cast

 Jamie Lee Curtis as Laurie Strode, a survivor of Michael Myers's 1978 killing spree and Allyson's grandmother
 Andi Matichak as Allyson Nelson, Laurie's granddaughter
 Rohan Campbell as Corey Cunningham, a young man accused of murdering a child while he babysat, leading to him becoming a pariah in Haddonfield
 Will Patton as Deputy Frank Hawkins, a sheriff's deputy who arrested Michael following his initial killing spree in 1978
 Kyle Richards as Lindsey Wallace, one of the children Laurie babysat in 1978 who survived an encounter with Michael in 2018
 James Jude Courtney as Michael Myers / The Shape, the masked figure who carried out a horrific massacre on Halloween night in 1978, returned to Haddonfield for another killing spree forty years later in 2018
 Nick Castle, who portrayed the character in the original 1978 film, provides voiceover work for Myers's breathing and makes an unrelated cameo appearance in a party scene.
Also appearing in the film are Jesse C. Boyd as Officer Doug Mulaney, Allyson's ex-boyfriend; Joanne Baron as Joan Cunningham, Corey's overbearing mother; Rick Moose as Ronald Prevo, Corey's stepfather who owns the salvage yard; Michael Barbieri as Terry Tramer, leader of the gang of bullies who target Corey; Destiny Mone as Stacy, Joey Harris as Margo, and Marteen as Billy, members of Terry's gang; Michael O'Leary as Dr. Mathis, Allyson's boss at the local hospital; Michele Dawson as Deb, Allyson's coworker who is having an affair with Dr. Mathis; Keraun Harris as Willy the Kid, a local radio DJ; Jaxon Goldberg as Jeremy Allen, a young boy who dies while Corey is babysitting him; Candice Rose and Jack William Marshall as Theresa and Roger Allen, Jeremy's parents; and Omar Dorsey as Sheriff Barker, Haddonfield's current sheriff.

Production

Development
In June 2018, Danny McBride confirmed that he and David Gordon Green had originally intended to pitch two films that would be shot back-to-back, and then decided against it, waiting to see the reaction to their first Halloween film (2018). In September, producer Jason Blum said that "we will do a sequel if the movie performs". A month later, after the new film Halloweens opening weekend, McBride confirmed that early development on a sequel had begun. Green, McBride and Jeff Fradley had planned out a two-film story arc, but opted for a trilogy after realizing they had more material than originally thought. As soon as Halloween was released in theaters, McBride and Green started devising the story for two sequels alongside other writers such as Scott Teems, Chris Bernier and Paul Brad Logan for each individual sequel, with both sequels being written simultaneously by different writing teams, with Green and McBride mainly writing them and then bringing other writers to "curate" their "crazy" brains and give focus to the story. In July 2019, Bloody Disgusting reported that a third film was also in development, with Green returning as director. The site also claimed that the studio was considering releasing both films in October 2020. 

In July 2019, Universal Pictures revealed the titles and release dates of the two sequels, with Halloween Kills and Halloween Ends set to be released in 2020 and 2021, respectively. Green was officially announced to direct both films and co-write the scripts with McBride, Teems was confirmed as a co-writer for Halloween Kills, while Logan and Bernier were announced as co-writers of Halloween Ends. Blum, Malek Akkad and Bill Block were slated to produce the film while John Carpenter, Curtis, Green and McBride were attached as executive producers once again. The writing team, consisting of Green, McBride, Bernier and Logan, started workshopping ideas before production of Halloween Kills commenced, completing a first draft in 2019. The final script was completed in 2021 pending Carpenter's approval. Due to the COVID-19 pandemic, Universal delayed the release dates of both Kills and Ends by a year.

Writing
Green set out to make each sequel different. For the second film, he wanted an action film and for the finale a love story, in part to subvert viewers' expectations. Green intended to further explore what can make a person turn into a psychopath through Corey Cunningham's character; Green conceived Corey in order to explore and get a perspective of how Michael Myers and Laurie Strode affected the town of Haddonfield, with Corey devised as someone traumatized like Strode that encounters an evil stalker like Myers that ends up "infecting" him into turning evil and let spread his unchecked negative inner entities instead of "wrapping them around their heads, be their own heroes and thus get a chance to fight them". Benefitting from a character arc closely similar to that of Keith Gordon's Arnie Cunningham from Carpenter's Christine (1983), Corey was overall created to mimic how neglected community members can unexpectedly turn to evil. The role was also inspired by real-life perpetrators of school shootings; Corey's inclusion allowed Green to orchestrate very different "kills" to those Myers committed in the previous two films, as Corey wants to emulate Myers' violent acts but is somewhat "messy" with his kills, not killing people "well" like Myers does. Carpenter gave Green and McBride his approval for Corey when he was informed he would be one of the film's protagonists, congratulating them of not rehashing the same plotline in every film, which Carpenter himself struggled to do when writing Halloween II (1981).

In October 2021, Green revealed that Halloween Ends will take place four years after the events of Halloween Kills and would incorporate elements of the pandemic into the story. In an interview, Logan distinguished internet rumors that the film was supposed to take place on the same night of the previous installments. Curtis claimed the film will be "shocking" and will "make people very angry". Akkad stated Ends will be more "contained" than Kills, while Green called it an intimate coming-of-age story, much like Carpenter's Christine. Other cited influences on the film were Willard (1971), Butcher, Baker, Nightmare Maker (1981), My Bodyguard (1980), Blood Rage, Bad Taste (both 1987) and Fallen Angels (1995); the latter two specifically inspiring the motorcycle bonding scene between Allyson Nelson and Corey Cunningham with Wong Kar-wai's "coolness" and the celebratory My Bodyguard moment. Most of the films were generally movies Green wasn't allowed to see as a child back in the 1980s, hence why he went to a friend's house to watch them in a VHS format.

According to Green, several different endings were considered for the film; Green ultimately chose a more "satisfactory, optimistic, hopeful" conclusion after Killss "bleak" ending, compensating for the traumatic events that Laurie Strode lived through in the film and its predecessors. The first planned, darker ending had Laurie Strode committing suicide at the end of the film, but according to Green, the "moment in which Laurie put a gun to her mouth" was the one where he, Brad Logan, Bernier and McBride had to make the decision and starting coming up with different Choose Your Own Adventure-type alternatives. Another darker ending the writers considered had Corey Cunningham not only surviving the film's events and getting away with his murders, but also convincing Allyson to join him and the two running off to "hit the road" in a Natural Born Killers (1994)-style ending. Other versions had Corey realizing the error of his ways and "stepping back" after getting his toe stuck in some water or Corey becoming Michael Myers' successor in case the filmmakers wished to keep making more Halloween films after Green's departure from the series.

Casting

In July 2019, along with the announcements of two sequels to 2018's Halloween, it was announced that Jamie Lee Curtis would reprise her role as Laurie Strode in both Halloween Kills and Halloween Ends. Judy Greer and Andi Matichak were confirmed to reprise their roles as Karen and Allyson Nelson that same month, though, Greer was not included in Ends as her character Karen was killed during the climax of Kills. In December 2021, it was revealed that Kyle Richards would be reprising her role for the film. Initially, the character was not expected to return for the film, but following the positive reception to Richards's performance, the script was rewritten to give her an expanded role. The following month, Michael O'Leary joined the cast.

Upon being cast around 2018 or 2019, aside from being unaware he had been auditioning for a Halloween film, Rohan Campbell was initially unaware of his character's significance to the story, expecting him to die early on due to his role as a babysitter in the film's opening. To help shape his performance, Campbell was asked by Green to watch horror films about outcasts. Upon meeting with Campbell, Green "fell in love" with what they could do to Corey and it partly led him to change the original ending he envisioned for the character to not leave his fate open-ended. Campbell was one of the hundreds of actors who auditioned for Corey Cunningham, but Green and his assistant director chose him due to having a neutral "tough but sensitive" face, a neutral "handsomeness" and a look of having "life and emotion" plus his physicality, which later led Green to convince himself that Campbell could accurately portray Corey as a motorcycle rider instead of just acting like he knew due to his experiences, partially embodying the 1980s leather jacket bad boy. Green worked to keep the actor out of the press leading up to the film's release. According to Campbell, both Green and Curtis warned him about potential backlash regarding the introduction of his character.

A casting call took place in late January and February 2022 in numerous Southeast Georgia towns. In an interview with Collider, Green hinted that co-writer Danny McBride had requested a cameo appearance in the film, potentially as a character who fights Myers. In June 2022, Nick Castle announced that he would make a cameo appearance unrelated to the role of Michael Myers. Following the release of the teaser trailer in July 2022, Omar Dorsey, Will Patton, and James Jude Courtney were revealed to reprise their roles from the previous films. Green cited Courtney's "extraordinary work" in the previous films as the reason for his decision to have him portray Michael Myers for the entirety of the film.

Filming
It was originally planned to film Halloween Kills and Halloween Ends back-to-back, but did not occur due to the "intense schedule". In March 2020, Blum confirmed filming would take place during the summer. Filming was quietly delayed due to the COVID-19 pandemic. Production was expected to take place in 2021 in Wilmington, North Carolina. In August 2021, Courtney confirmed that filming will begin on January 10, 2022. However, filming officially began on January 19, 2022, in Savannah, Georgia under the working title Cave Dweller. Michael Simmonds once again served as director of photography. Curtis began filming her scenes on January 25 and wrapped on February 22. Campbell insisted on filming himself the scene in which Corey kills one of his bullies instead of requiring a stuntman's assistance. Green allowed his actors to improvise to infuse humor within the film's tone. The last showdown between the franchise's main characters was assembled and reassembled throughout filming, having been written "spectacularly" since the film's first draft, forcing the stunt team to try new things occasionally and creating several continuity errors in the process due to returning with new additions to the filming set multiple times. Additional scenes were shot in Sylvania, Georgia. Filming concluded on March 9, 2022.

In June 2022, two weeks of re-shoots took place in Savannah. However, these re-shoots only lasted four days and were completed that same month. As with most of his films since his very first assembly, Green test screened Ends to see if it engaged audiences or not. After several test screenings, the original final confrontation between Laurie Strode and Michael Myers as well as the ending sequence were discarded, and re-shoots for new scenes took place, four months ahead of the film's premiere. The climatic procession sequence, when Michael Myers' corpse is paraded to all surviving Haddonfielders and disposed of inside an industrial shredder, was a late addition to the film that was shot around August 2022 after Green and his crew concluded that they wished for "something more grand" for the film's ending. It was decided that the film's conclusion should be more "modest" and "intimate" with some story points as opposed to a brawl like the "super noisy and aggressive" ending of Kills, with Green wishing to return the series to its "simple dramatic roots".

Post-production
In June 2022, Blum confirmed that the film had test screened internally the month prior and that it would be the last Halloween film from Blumhouse. The following month, Carpenter described the film as a "departure" from the previous entries in Green's trilogy. In August, Castle had finished ADR for Michael Myers. By the end of the month, Green stated that the film was still being tweaked despite the film being picture locked. According to cinematographer Michael Simmonds, a practical version of the opening titles sequence, showing jack-o'-lanterns emerging from within each other, was initially created by production designer Richard Wright, but later replaced by a digital version. The film's opening features blue titles in reference to Halloween III: Season of the Witch (1982), the original second sequel to the 1978 film.

Music

The score for Halloween Ends was composed by John Carpenter, his son Cody Carpenter, and Daniel Davies, who had previously collaborated on the first two films in the series. The official soundtrack was released digitally on October 14, 2022, by Sacred Bones Records, with a limited vinyl release set for January 20, 2023. In anticipation of the film's premiere, two tracks were released in September 2022, "The Junk Yard" and "The Procession". Recorded entirely at Carpenter and Davies's home studios, the score incorporates themes from the original 1978 film and features original music from electronic music group Boy Harsher.

Release
Halloween Ends premiered at Grauman's Chinese Theater, Los Angeles, as part of Beyond Fest on October 11, 2022. The premiere coincided with Curtis's induction ceremony at the Hollywood Walk of Fame in front of the theater the following day. The film was released theatrically in the United States by Universal Pictures on October 14, 2022, playing in 3,901 theaters for a total theatrical run of approximately 3.8 weeks. In addition, the film started streaming simultaneously on paid tiers of Peacock for 60 days. It was initially set to release on October 15, 2021, before being delayed due to the COVID-19 pandemic.

Home media
Halloween Ends was released digitally on November 15, 2022, and was released on Blu-ray and DVD on December 27, 2022.

Reception

Box office and streaming numbers
Halloween Ends grossed $64.1 million in the United States and Canada, and $40.9 million in other territories, for a worldwide total of $105 million. It was the lowest-grossing out of the trilogy of Halloween films directed by David Gordon Green.

In the United States and Canada, Halloween Ends was projected to gross $50–60 million from 3,901 theaters in its opening weekend. The film made $20.2 million on its first day, including $5.4 million from Thursday night previews, up 11% from Killss $4.85 million the year prior. It went on to debut with $40.1 million, topping the box office but finishing below projections, blamed in part on the film's simultaneous release to streaming platform Peacock; Universal reported it was the most watched film or series ever on the platform over a two-day period. The studio also reported that the film was most popular among audiences aged 18 to 34, with only 26% being 35 and older. The film dropped by 80% in its second weekend, finishing fourth with $8 million. The 88% drop from the film's first Friday to second was a "near-record" decrease and was credited to its day-and-date streaming release and poor reception by critics and audiences. 

According to Samba TV, the film was viewed by 920,000 households in its first week of streaming on the platform, down from Halloween Killss 1.7 million households. The film received enough views in the week of October 10–16, 2022, however, to rank number eight overall and the top film for that week's Nielsen streaming rankings, making it the first program on Peacock to rank in the weekly Nielsen top 10.

Critical response
On the review aggregator website Rotten Tomatoes, the film holds an approval rating of 40% based on 253 reviews, and an average rating of 5.1/10. The site's critical consensus reads, "Halloween Endsfor now, anywaywith a frequently befuddling installment that's stabbed, slashed, and beaten by a series of frustrating missed opportunities." On Metacritic, the film has a weighted average score of 47 out of 100, based on 46 critics, indicating "mixed or average reviews". Audiences polled by CinemaScore gave the film an average grade of "C+" on an A+ to F scale, the lowest of the franchise, while those at PostTrak gave it an overall 64% positive score.

Richard Roeper of the Chicago Sun-Times gave the film 1.5 out of 4 stars, writing that the "so-called finale of the Michael Myers saga is just stabbing, metaphors, stabbing, soap opera, stabbing, marching band bullies, stabbing and more stabbing". Writing for Variety, Owen Gleiberman said the film is "neither scary nor fun" and called it "the most joylessly metaphorical and convoluted entry" of the franchise to date. Ben Travis of Empire gave a negative review, calling the film "lost up in its own abyss" and "an unsatisfying closing chapter" and criticizing Green's direction as "[struggling] to synthesise the serious stuff with the demands of a popcorn shocker". In his review for The Hollywood Reporter, David Rooney called it "a sloppy movie whose principal new inspiration feels bogus", although "horror fans might enjoy homages to other films from the Carpenter canon". Giving 1.5 out of 4 stars, Brian Tallerico of RogerEbert.com found the film to be "poorly executed", rushed, and "barely a Halloween movie" due to the story's focus on newly introduced characters, and considered Rohan Campbell's performance especially lacking.

In a positive review, K. Austin Collins of Rolling Stone deemed Halloween Ends the best out of Green's Halloween trilogy, noting its "interestingly complex tangle of emotions and fears" and comparing it to Green's previous "capably observed" independent films. The New York Times reviewed the film as being "a movie that's less frantic and more intimate than its predecessor, one that unfolds with a mourning finality". Time Out also reviewed the film more positively than they did Kills, giving it a 3-star review and calling it a "pleasant surprise". While also considering it an improvement over its predecessor, Todd Gilchrist of The A.V. Club criticized the lack of focus on the series' main antagonist and ultimately labeled it "not particularly good" and an "unsatisfying close". Kyle Smith of The Wall Street Journal found Curtis's performance "a pleasure to watch" and called the film "largely gripping". Toronto Stars Peter Howell gave the film 2.5 out of 4 stars, describing it as "clever" and "likely to go down well with fans of the franchise" but noted that true finality is likely impossible for this series.

Accolades

Future
John Carpenter explained that possible future installments were dependent on the commercial success of Ends, although he acknowledged that Green was adamant in Ends being their story's ending. In an interview with The New York Times, Jamie Lee Curtis commented that the four films, commencing with the 1978 Halloween and concluding with Halloween Ends, were self-contained, although there was still the possibility of a new narrative being adapted into future films. Green stated that he was confident on parting with Jamie Lee Curtis' Laurie Strode with the film, though he acknowledged the possibility of eventually some filmmakers creating a "new Laurie" with some plot twist to continue the franchise's mythology. Curtis had previously confirmed in an essay for People that Halloween Ends marked her last appearance in the franchise; Jude Courtney likewise affirmed to Screen Rant that, alongside Curtis, he feels "done" with the franchise due to both his age and career trajectory, having felt Halloween and Kills as playoffs and Ends as a Super Bowl win so he decided to retire as the character triumphantly. Jason Blum reiterated that, while it would not necessarily be the final film in the franchise, it will be the last Halloween movie under Blumhouse Productions, with the intellectual property rights reverting to producer Malek Akkad following the release of Ends.

Notes

References

External links 

 
 
 

2022 films
2022 horror thriller films
2020s American films
2020s coming-of-age films
2020s English-language films
2020s serial killer films
2020s slasher films
American coming-of-age films
American films about revenge
American horror thriller films
American sequel films
American serial killer films
American slasher films
Blumhouse Productions films
Films about bullying
Films about dysfunctional families
Films about old age
Films about post-traumatic stress disorder
Films directed by David Gordon Green
Films postponed due to the COVID-19 pandemic
Films produced by Jason Blum
Films scored by John Carpenter
Films set in 2019
Films set in 2022
Films set in Illinois
Films shot in Savannah, Georgia
13
IMAX films
Miramax films
American romantic horror films
Universal Pictures films